Ernst Reiter (born 31 October 1962 in Ruhpolding) is a former German biathlete who represented West Germany. At the 1984 Olympics in Sarajevo, Reiter won a bronze medal with the West German relay team consisting of Peter Angerer, Walter Pichler and Fritz Fischer. And at the 1988 Olympics in Calgary. Reiter won a silver medal with the West German relay team consisting of Peter Angerer, Stefan Höck and Fritz Fischer

References

Sports Reference

1962 births
Living people
German male biathletes
Biathletes at the 1984 Winter Olympics
Biathletes at the 1988 Winter Olympics
Olympic medalists in biathlon
Olympic biathletes of West Germany
Olympic silver medalists for West Germany
Olympic bronze medalists for West Germany
Biathlon World Championships medalists
Medalists at the 1984 Winter Olympics
Medalists at the 1988 Winter Olympics
People from Traunstein (district)
Sportspeople from Upper Bavaria